Nicolás René Ruvalcaba Flores (born October 7, 1982, in Guadalajara, Jalisco) is a Mexican former professional footballer who played for Lobos BUAP.

See also
Football in Mexico
List of football clubs in Mexico

References

External links

Living people
1982 births
Mexican footballers
Footballers from Guadalajara, Jalisco
Association football defenders